The Rio Sul Center Tower, also known as Rio Sul Tower, is the fourteenth tallest building in Brazil and the tallest building in Rio de Janeiro at  and 50 floors, 48 above ground and 2 below. The structure contains 28 elevators It was completed in 1982.

The building was designed by architects Ulysses Burlamaqui and Alexandre Chan in the Brutalist architectural style. The tower, together with a 400 stores shopping mall called Riosul Shopping Center, form a commercial complex known as Rio Sul Center.

See also 
 List of tallest buildings in South America
 List of tallest buildings in Brazil

References

External links
 

Skyscrapers in Rio de Janeiro (city)
Brutalist architecture in Brazil
1982 establishments in Brazil
Skyscraper office buildings in Brazil
Retail buildings in Brazil
Office buildings completed in 1982